Andrea Lisuzzo (born 26 January 1981) is a former Italian footballer. Lisuzzo has played over 200 matches in Serie C1/Lega Pro Prima Divisione.

Career
Born in Palermo, Lisuzzo started his career at hometown club Palermo. He then played for Foggia of Serie C1, Fano, Martina and again Foggia. On 23 May 2009 he agreed a new 2-year contract with Foggia.

Novara
On 7 July 2009 he was transferred to Novara. He was a regular starter of the team, winning promotion twice, which the team would play in 2011–12 Serie A.

Spezia
On 10 July 2013 Lisuzzo joined Spezia Calcio.

Pisa
On 30 July 2014 Lisuzzo joined A.C. Pisa 1909.

Honours
Lega Pro Prima Divisione:  2010
Supercoppa di Lega di Prima Divisione:  2010

References

External links
 Football.it Profile 

Italian footballers
Serie A players
Serie B players
Serie C players
Palermo F.C. players
Calcio Foggia 1920 players
S.S.D. Città di Gela players
Alma Juventus Fano 1906 players
A.S.D. Martina Calcio 1947 players
Novara F.C. players
Spezia Calcio players
Pisa S.C. players
Association football central defenders
Footballers from Palermo
1981 births
Living people